Cristinel Gafiţa (born 14 June 1987) is a Romanian former footballer. He played for the first team of Ceahlăul Piatra Neamţ for the first time in 2006.

References

External links
 
 
 

1987 births
Living people
People from Suceava County
Romanian footballers
Association football forwards
Liga I players
Liga II players
CSM Ceahlăul Piatra Neamț players
FC Botoșani players
ACS Foresta Suceava players